S. Malachamy was an Indian civil servant and administrator. He was the administrator of Mahe from  21 July 1973 to 26 November 1974.

References 

 

Year of birth missing
Possibly living people
Administrators of Mahe